Caroline Brodahl (born 21 August 1992), is a Norwegian team handball player. She plays for the club Thames Handball Club. She was mentioned as a key player in 2013, when the club played in London against a top team of Hungarian handball players and won. In December 2013 she won the Jack Petchey Award for her sporting achievements. In 2014/15 she participated in the Women's EHF Challenge Cup Round 3 where she scored goals in both, home and away matches. Where highly unusually identical goal scores were recorded on both playing dates.

References

Norwegian female handball players
1992 births
Living people